Trance is an album by the Moroccan musician Hassan Hakmoun. It was released in 1993. He is credited with his band, Zahar. Hakmoun supported the album by playing "The Musical World of Islam" concert series, in 1993, as well as Woodstock '94.

Production
Recorded at Peter Gabriel's Real World Studios, in Wiltshire, England, the album was produced by Simon Emmerson. Hakmoun played the sintir, an instrument similar to a three-stringed bass. He was backed on many tracks by Egyptian percussion.

Critical reception

The Chicago Reader wrote that Hakmoun "transplanted the mysteriously powerful trance-out grooves of Gnawa music into a vital, contemporary sound without watering down its primal spirit." The Guardian determined that "all but one of the songs are underpinned by muscular percussion, and veer from mesmeric Arabic chanting to bursts of jazz fusion, sax solos, frenzied guitar work, or—strangest of all—a Moroccan interpretation of Jamaican ragga."

The Calgary Herald stated that Hakmoun's "voice reaches deep and soars high while singing of human love, of the ways of Allah," writing that the music incorporates "rock and funk, percussive Afro-jazz grooves, buoyed by wild guitar riffs and sax solos." The Edmonton Journal deemed the album "innovative, vibrant Afro-beat." Rolling Stone concluded: "Black Moroccan Gnawa funk rock, Trance is a world fusion that works—even the obligatory hiphop mix is on the dime."

AllMusic wrote: "From the Hendrix-in-a-fez riff of 'Bania' to the fuzz-box nirvana of 'Challaban', Trance asserts psychedelic sovereignty over Moroccan sensibilities that hippie hash-heads once claimed as their own music base."

Track listing

References

1993 albums
Real World Records albums